Gustaf Storgårds (11 December 1869 in Lapinjärvi – 11 November 1945) was a Finnish Lutheran clergyman and politician. He was a member of the Parliament of Finland from 1913 to 1916, representing the Swedish People's Party of Finland (SFP).

References

1869 births
1945 deaths
People from Lapinjärvi
People from Uusimaa Province (Grand Duchy of Finland)
Swedish-speaking Finns
20th-century Finnish Lutheran clergy
Swedish People's Party of Finland politicians
Members of the Parliament of Finland (1913–16)
University of Helsinki alumni
19th-century Finnish Lutheran clergy